Santos Dumont is a Brazilian mini-series produced by HBO Brazil that dramatizes the life of inventor Alberto Santos Dumont.

Synopsis
The miniseries deals with the inventor's childhood in Brazil, parallel to his mature period in France, where he was involved in the evolution of lighter- and heavier-than-air aircraft.

Production
The pre-production took four years, where scriptwriters Pedro Mota Gueiros and Gabriel Mariani Flaksman did extensive research among the various biographies and texts written by or about the aviator.

Actor João Pedro Zappa did five months of intensive French lessons to participate in the production, even stayed two weeks in Cannes to train the language, Belgian actor Thierry Tremouroux helped him in the language and considered him to be the most complex character he has ever faced.

Entrepreneur Alan Calassa lent his replicas of 14-bis and Demoiselle for production. The technical drawings were recreated by the team that opted for the most practical effects. The production filmed scenes outside the National Museum before the fire.

Cast
 João Pedro Zappa  -  Santos Dumont
 Miguel Pinheiro       -  Nuno
 Joana de Verona       -  Almerinda
 Guilherme Garcia  - Santos Dumont (child)
 Thierry Tremouroux     - Albert Chapin
 Josias Duarte         - Etienne
 Jean Pierre Noher
 Antonio Saboia        - Louis Blériot
 Kauan Ceglio            - Jorge Dumont
 Cláudio Perotto - Father Jonas

Episodes

See also
 Alberto Santos Dumont
 List of Santos-Dumont aircraft
 My Airships (Autobiography by Santos Dumont)
 O que eu vi, o que nós veremos (Portuguese autobiography).

References

External links

Alberto Santos-Dumont
2019 Brazilian television series debuts
Brazilian television miniseries
Brazilian drama television series
Portuguese-language television shows
French-language television shows
Portuguese-language HBO original programming
Television shows set in Brazil
Television shows set in Paris
Television shows set in the United States
English-language television shows
Spanish-language HBO original programming